The Vengalil family (Malayalam: വെങ്ങാലിൽ; Hindi: वेङ्ङालिल; also transliterated as Vengayil or Vengyalil) is an aristocratic Keralite Nair family from Malabar that was powerful in India during much of the British Raj, and known as intimates of the Nehru-Gandhi family.

Background
Closely affiliated with the Dewanship of Travancore and related to the royal families of Cochin and Travancore, the Vengalil family were among India's greatest landowners until the rise of the communist government in Kerala, with estates in Malabar comprising some 200,000 acres, and encompassing thousands of acres of prized hardwood forest, including the hydroelectric power center of Kuttiyadi. The family originated through the marriage of Raman Menon, Dewan of Travancore (1815–1817) serving Maharani Gowri Parvati Bayi and his wife, Narayani Amma.

Influential members include politician V. K. Krishna Menon, author Janaki Ram,  as well as C. P. Ramaswami Aiyar by marriage. Numerous members of the Vengalil family held titles equivalent to that of Thakur or Raja in north India.

References
 Krishna Menon: A Biography by T. J. S. George (1965)
 V. K. Krishna Menon: a personal memoir by Janaki Ram (1997)

Colonial Kerala
Indian noble families